Springdale is a census-designated place and unincorporated community in Park County, Montana, United States. Its population was 42 at the 2010 census. The community is located near Interstate 90 and the Yellowstone River. Springdale has its own ZIP code, 59082.

Demographics

History
The community was founded in the area of a hot spring by rancher Cyrus B. Mendenhall in 1882. Springdale had a post office from 1885 until 2004.

Climate
This climatic region is typified by large seasonal temperature differences, with warm to hot (and often humid) summers and cold (sometimes severely cold) winters.  According to the Köppen Climate Classification system, Springdale has a humid continental climate, abbreviated "Dfb" on climate maps.

References

Census-designated places in Park County, Montana
Census-designated places in Montana
Unincorporated communities in Montana
Unincorporated communities in Park County, Montana